Amanitenmemide was a Nubian king whose throne name was Nebmaatre. His name is written in Meroitic, while his throne name is written in classical Egyptian hieroglyphs. 

He is thus far only known from his pyramid in Meroe (Beg. N17). The pyramid occupies an area of 8.6 X 8.6 m and is, therefore, one of the smaller royal pyramids at Meroe. In front of the pyramid there was a decorated chapel. The decoration was copied by the Lepsius expedition. One wall was brought to Berlin, where it is displayed in the Neues Museum.  Another, now only preserved in six blocks, is in the British Museum in London. 

Three skeletons were found in the burial chamber of the pyramid - two of them belonging to women, the third to a man of about 30 years, which are, perhaps, the remains of the king himself.

There is little evidence for dating the king. The small size of the pyramid indicates a date after Natakamani, under whom the pyramids in general became smaller. It has been suggested that Amanitenmemide belongs to the first century AD.

References

Literature 
 Inge Hofmann, Beiträge zur meroitischen Chronologie, St. Augustin bei Bonn 1978, p. 139, 
Laszlo Török, in: Fontes Historiae Nubiorum, Vol. III, Bergen 1998, p. 914-916,

External links 
The decoration of the chapel copied by the Lepsius expedition (top left and bottom left)

1st-century monarchs of Kush
1st-century monarchs in Africa
Sculptures of the Berlin State Museums
Egyptological objects of the Berlin State Museums